The Viking raid on Galicia and Asturias occurred in 844. Many longships were lost in the attack and the fleet retreated to Aquitaine.

Raid
In 844, the Vikings, who at that time infested all the maritime provinces of Europe, made a descent at A Coruña, and began to raid the countryside, burning and pillaging. King Ramiro I of Asturias marched against them with a potent army, managed to rout the invaders with a prodigious slaughter, took many of them as prisoners, and burned the best part of their fleet. Ramiro's reception frightened the Viking raiders, so raiding parties no longer troubled the parts of Spain that were under the king's control.

See also
 Viking raid on Seville
 Sack of Santiago de Compostela

References

Viking Age in Spain
Battles involving the Kingdom of Asturias
Battles involving the Vikings
840s conflicts
844